The 2010–11 Liga Profesional de Primera División season, also known as the 2010–11 Copa Uruguaya or the 2010–11 Campeonato Uruguayo, was the 107th season of Uruguay's top-flight football league, and the 80th in which it was professional.

Nacional won their 43rd Primera División title after defeating Defensor Sporting in the season-ending final.

Teams
Sixteen teams will compete in the Primera División this season. Thirteen teams remained from the 2009–10 season. Atenas, Cerrito, and Cerro Largo were relegated after accumulating the fewest points in the season aggregate table. They were replaced by El Tanque Sisley, Bella Vista, and Miramar Misiones, the 2009–10 Segunda División winner, runner-up, and playoff winner, respectively. All of the new teams are making repeat appearances. All the teams in this season are from Montevideo, except Tacuarembó F.C., who comes from the city they are named for.

Torneo Apertura
The Torneo Apertura "Sudáfrica 2010" was the first tournament of the season. It began on August 21, 2010 and ended on December 5, 2010.

Standings

Results

Top goalscorers

Source:

Torneo Clausura
The Torneo Clausura is the second tournament of the season. It began on February 5, 2011 and ended on June 5, 2011.

Standings

Results

Top goalscorers

Aggregate table

Top goalscorers

Relegation

Championship playoff
Defensor Sporting and Nacional qualified to the championship playoffs as the Apertura and Clausura winners, respectively. Additionally, Nacional re-qualified as the team with the most points in the season aggregate table. Given this situation, an initial playoff was held between the two teams. Nacional needed to win the playoff to become the season champion; Defensor Sporting needed to win the playoff to force a two-legged final. Nacional won the match 1–0 for their 43rd Primera División title.

Semi-final

See also
2010–11 in Uruguayan football

References
General

Specific

External links
Official webpage 
Season regulation 

2010-11
1
Uru
Uru